NBA Live 98 is a basketball video game based on the National Basketball Association and the fourth installment of the NBA Live series. Its cover art features Tim Hardaway of the Miami Heat. The game was developed by EA Sports and released on October 31, 1997, for the PC, November 30, 1997, for the PlayStation and December 31, 1997, for the Sega Saturn. It was the final NBA Live game released for the Super NES, Genesis, and Sega Saturn.

The game introduced the now-standard feature of passing to any teammate with a single button press. Its graphical improvements included new player designs modeled after actual player photographs. The PC version introduced support for 3D acceleration, utilizing 3dfx's Glide API. The PlayStation, PC, and Saturn versions feature Ernie Johnson Jr. as studio announcer. Play-by-play commentary is performed by TNT/TBS color analyst Verne Lundquist in the PlayStation and PC versions. NBA Live 98 is followed by NBA Live 99.

Gameplay 
The game features rosters from the 1997–98 NBA season. New features include the "Total Control" system, that allows players to choose between a dunk or layup or pass to any teammate with the press of a button. "Tight" player moves allow players to spin, crossover, back down, ball fake and more on command. Player lock lets players always control a specified player on court.

Though it is set during the 1997–98 season, Chicago Bulls superstar Michael Jordan is not featured in the game. This was because Jordan was not part of the National Basketball Players Association and at the time the cost of licensing his individual name and likeness for video games was approximately $15 million a year, beyond the total budget of most video games. Jordan is replaced by the fictional "Roster Player" in the Bulls lineup. However, Charles Barkley made his first appearance in Live 98 as a member of the Houston Rockets.

Motion capture work was done by NBA players Tim Hardaway, Mitch Richmond, Larry Johnson, Joe Dumars and Christian Laettner.

Features
New modes introduced include GM Mode, which lets players choose franchises, draft players and play custom seasons, and the Three-Point Shootout, which can be played using full or split screen. Four difficulty levels are available, including a new Superstar difficulty level, along with improved AI with smarter players and more accurate stats.

With the introduction of 3D players, courts, and jerseys came an opportunity to patch and update these aspects of the game, including with the EA Graphics Editor software.

Reception

The PlayStation release received mostly positive reviews. Critics praised the detailed player graphics, new animations, interface, music, and the full motion video sequences. GamePro commented, "What makes Live '98 so enjoyable to play is its fantastic mixture of NBA realism and wild arcade action." GameSpot assessed it as an across-the-board improvement over NBA Live 97.

Critics hailed the number of new gameplay features, with the three-point competition, custom team feature, icon passing, and direct ducking all earning particular mention. A few criticisms were voiced, but they did little to impact the critic's overall recommendation. For example, Jay Boor of IGN found the dunks were not as dramatic as they should be, but still concluded NBA Live 98 to be the best basketball game presently on the market. Sushi-X wrote in Electronic Gaming Monthly that weak A.I. makes it "the easiest basketball game I've ever played." However, his three co-reviewers were more laudatory, with Kraig Kujawa summing up, "NBA Live 97 was easily the best basketball game last year, and now Live 98 has done it again."

As with NBA Live 97, critics reported the Saturn port to have much lower-resolution textures and jerkier frame rate than the PlayStation version, to the point where the action can be hard to follow. Critics also found the absence of play-by-play commentary in the Saturn port a severe shortcoming. Kraig Kujawa and John Ricciardi of Electronic Gaming Monthly, who both rated the PlayStation version a 9/10, gave the Saturn version a 5.5/10 and 6/10 respectively, with Kujawa remarking, "Obviously, this was a quick and easy port that was paid very little attention. ... EA could and should have done a better job." GameSpot and Sega Saturn Magazine, while noting that the Saturn port retains strong aspects of the PlayStation original, judged that it compared unfavorably with NBA Action 98, another Saturn basketball game which was released at the same time. Gary Cutlack of Sega Saturn Magazine summarized, "Live '98 isn't that bad, it's just unfortunate for EA that Sega are releasing their better NBA game at the same time."

NBA Live 98 was a runner-up for Computer Gaming Worlds 1997 "Sports Game of the Year" award, which ultimately went to Baseball Mogul and CART Precision Racing in a tie. Editors called NBA Live 98 "the latest and best [...] in EA's awesome action-oriented" series.

References

External links
 IGN: NBA Live '98
 

1997 video games
Electronic Arts games
NBA Live
Windows games
PlayStation (console) games
Sega Saturn games
Super Nintendo Entertainment System games
Sega Genesis games
Tiertex Design Studios games
Video games developed in Canada
Video games scored by Brian L. Schmidt
Video games set in 1997
Video games set in 1998
Multiplayer and single-player video games

ru:NBA Live 98